Grain Power Station is a CCGT power station and former oil-fired power station in Kent, England, with operational capacity of  owned by Uniper (formerly E.ON UK).

Oil-fired power station
Grain was built on a  site for the nationalised Central Electricity Generating Board. The architects were Farmer & Dark with Donald Rudd and Partners. It was built by several contractors including John Laing Construction (Civils), the Cleveland Bridge Company (steel frame and cladding), N. G. Bailey (electrical), Babcock & Wilcox (boilers) and GEC Turbine Generators Ltd (steam turbines). The site was selected in 1971 and construction had begun by 1975. The station became operational in 1979.

The principal buildings were the main boiler house - turbine house block, an attached central control wing, a detached range of offices, the chimney and a gas turbine power station. The buildings are steel framed and reinforced concrete construction. The main boiler house – turbine house block was nearly half a kilometre long. The larger buildings had curved eaves and slightly pitched roofs, an attempt to reduce the visual impact of the site. 

Grain power station was located on the Isle of Grain, where the River Medway flows into the Thames Estuary.

Grain adjoins the site of the BP Kent oil refinery, which closed in 1982. The station burned oil to drive, via steam turbines, two  (gross power output – but  was used on-site, leaving  for export to the Grid) alternators. There were four boilers rated at 592 kg/s, steam conditions were 538°C, with 538°C reheat. The station was capable of generating enough electricity to supply approximately 2% of Britain's peak electricity needs.

The two remaining oil-fired generating units were mothballed by Powergen in 2002 and 2003, but almost immediately the company began to consider reopening the plant as electricity prices increased rapidly. It was operated by E.ON UK who also operated the nearby Kingsnorth coal-fired station, now also decommissioned.

Closure and demolition
The plant did not meet the emissions requirements of the Large Combustion Plant Directive and was required to close by 2015.

However, due to the rising costs of maintaining the plant, E.ON UK, the owners of Grain power station, announced that Grain was to be mothballed and the site closed by 31 December 2012. The oil-fired power station generated no further electricity but was maintained as standby capacity for the grid throughout 2013.

In April 2014, the dismantling process at the site began, being carried out by Brown and Mason Ltd; it was expected to take around two years to complete.

On 10 May 2015, three buildings on the site were demolished. Three of the five boiler houses were demolished by explosives on 2 August 2015. Until 2014, BBC Radio Kent maintained an outside broadcast reception antenna on top of the chimney. The chimney is the UK's largest structure to have been demolished, surpassing the  New Brighton Tower which was demolished between 1919 and 1921.

Electricity output
Electricity output for Grain power station over the period 1979-1987 was as follows.

Grain gas turbine plant annual electricity output GWh.Grain power station annual electricity output GWh.The load factor in 1984/5 was greater than 100 per cent. Rotational capability plant was being operated at Grain, Ince and Littlebrook oil-fired power stations; this was in the context of the 1984-5 miners strike.

New combined cycle gas turbine plant
A new 1,275MW plant consisting of three natural gas-fired combined cycle gas turbine units capable of generating enough electricity to supply around one million homes has been constructed on the site. Construction work by Alstom started in May 2007, finished in May 2010, and cost £500 million. One of the gas turbines was first fired on 2 June 2010. The overall efficiency was expected to be 72%.

The power station is able to transfer up to 340MW of heat energy recovered from the steam condensation to run the vaporisers in the nearby liquefied natural gas terminal, allowing for a reduction in carbon emissions of up to 350,000 tonnes a year.

It has three GT26 gas turbines. The whole scheme is designed to three Alstom KA26 Single-Shaft Combined Cycle Power Plant Power Blocks; these include a STF30C reheat steam turbine, a heat recovery steam generator and a TOPGAS hydrogen-cooled turbogenerator each.

On 18 February 2022 during Storm Eunice, one of the chimney stacks collapsed. The power station was temporarily taken offline for safety.

References

External links

 Uniper

Energy infrastructure completed in 1979
Energy infrastructure completed in 2010
Towers completed in 1979
Oil-fired power stations in England
Uniper
Alstom
Medway
Power stations in South East England
Buildings and structures in Kent
Natural gas-fired power stations in England
Cogeneration power stations in England